Mikel Anthony Jones (born October 11, 2000) is an American football linebacker for the Syracuse Orange.

High school career
Jones was born on October 11, 2000, in Miami, Florida and attended Champagnat Catholic Schooland Mater Academy in (Hialeah Gardens, Florida. In August 2017, Jones transferred to IMG Academy in Bradenton, Florida for his senior year of high school, where he helped lead the IMG Academy Ascenders to a 7-1 record in 2018 and a top-5 national ranking. He was rated a consensus four-star prospect, one of the top 25 outside linebackers in the Class of 2019, and was recruited by Ole Miss, Kentucky, Louisville, Purdue, LSU, and Syracuse, where he ultimately enrolled.

College career

As a true freshman at Syracuse in 2019, Jones played in 12 games with four starts and had 38 tackles. In 2020, he started 11 games and recorded 69 tackles along with four interceptions, the most in the ACC and fifth nationally.

In 2021, Jones was a first-team All-ACC selection. He led the ACC with 60 solo tackles and had 110 total tackles. He also recorded four sacks. Syracuse head coach Dino Babers called him the "quarterback" of the defense for the Orange, as Jones led the team and the conference in solo, assisted and total tackles. After the strong showing in junior season, he was recruited by other programs and explored NFL Draft options, but decided against the jump and returned for another year.

In the 2022 season, Jones was named one of the team captains. He was named to several pre-season All-ACC and All-America teams, as well as watch lists for the Butkus Award, Nagurski Trophy, and Bednarik Award. He was named one of 15 semifinalists for the Butkus Award given to the top linebackers. After Syracuse's surprising 6–0 start, Jones penned an article in the Players' Tribune titled "Syracuse, Why Not Us???".

References

External links
Syracuse Orange bio

2000 births
Living people
American football linebackers
Players of American football from Miami
Syracuse Orange football players